The Four Queens Hotel and Casino is located in downtown Las Vegas on the Fremont Street Experience. The 690-room hotel and  casino is owned and operated by TLC Casino Enterprises, which acquired the property from the Elsinore Corporation in 2003.

History
Construction began on November 16, 1964. The $5.5 million project was planned to include an 18-story hotel. Four Queens opened on June 2, 1966. The casino is named after the builder Ben Goffstein's four daughters, Faith, Hope, Benita, and Michele. It originally contained only 120 rooms and a  casino. An 18-story hotel building was eventually added.

From 1972 to 2003 the hotel/casino was owned by Elsinore Corporation, a wholly owned subsidiary of the Hyatt Corporation until 1979, when it became an independent company. In 1995, Elsinore filed for Chapter 11 bankruptcy and the investment firm Morgens, Waterfall, Vintiadis & Company obtained 99 percent ownership of the company.

A second 18-story hotel building was completed in 1981.

Today the casino occupies the entire block bordered by Fremont Street, Casino Center, Third Street and Carson Avenue. The Four Queens was also a partner in renovating the downtown area and creating the Fremont Street Experience.

Terry Caudill purchased the Four Queens in 2003, and subsequently upgraded the casino's 1,040 slot machines. In December 2003 the Four Queens was the first Las Vegas casino to offer Geoff Hall's blackjack variant Blackjack Switch, which is now widely available throughout Las Vegas.

By March 2007, a $20 million, multiyear renovation was nearing completion. As part of the project, all 690 hotel rooms were renovated. A new restaurant, Chicago Brewing Company, was also added as part of the renovation. The project also included the  Canyon Club nightclub, which opened in April 2007.

Gallery

References

External links 

Casinos in the Las Vegas Valley
Downtown Las Vegas
Skyscraper hotels in Las Vegas
Landmarks in Nevada
Hotels established in 1966
Casino hotels
1966 establishments in Nevada